Muni Seva Ashram is complex of hospitals, schools and social institutions located at Goraj village of Waghodia Taluka in Vadodara district of Gujarat, India.

It was founded by Anuben Thakkar.

Mission statement
"To serve the needy section of the society, without regards to cast, Creed, religion or financial status of the recipient, employing the best available appropriate technologies and in complete harmony with the nature".

Institutes

Education 
 Bal Mandir-Kindergarten
 Sharda Mandir-Primary School
 Vivekanand-Secondary & Higher Secondary
 Eklavya Residential English School
 VTC -Vocational Training Center
 School of Nursing

Social Cause 
 Bhagani Mandir -Home for differently able Girls
 Parivar Mandir-New formed family
 Vanprasth Mandir-Home for Senior Citizens
 Atithi Mandir-Guest House

Health Care 
 Akshar Purshottam Arogya Mandir — Multi Facility Hospital
 Kailash Cancer Hospital & Research Center — Specialty Cancer Hospital

Sustainable Development 
 Renewable Energy
 Organic Farming
 Animal Husbandry

References

External links 
 Website of Muni Seva Ashram

Ashrams
Vadodara district